Soundaraj Periyanayagam (6 June 1949 – 21 March 2020) was an Indian Roman Catholic bishop and salesian priest.

Periyanayagam was born in India and was ordained to the priesthood in 1983. He served as bishop of the Roman Catholic Diocese of Vellore, India, from 2006 until his death in 2020. He died due to cardiac arrest on 21 March 2020.

Notes

1949 births
2020 deaths
21st-century Roman Catholic bishops in India